Serge Dovlet Said (born 11 November 1985) is a Lebanese footballer who plays as an attacking midfielder for  club Sagesse.

Club career 
Said began his career at Homenmen, and moved to Racing Beirut in 2007. He stayed with Racing for 15 years, before he left the team on 30 June 2022. On 8 July, Said signed for Sagesse.

International career 
Said made his international debut for Lebanon in a friendly match against Iraq on 22 January 2012, which resulted in a 1–0 home win. He made eight caps, playing his last game against Equatorial Guinea on 11 October 2016.

Honours 
Racing Beirut
 Lebanese Challenge Cup: 2016, 2017

References

External links 
 
 

1985 births
Living people
Footballers from Beirut
Lebanese footballers
Association football midfielders
Homenmen Beirut players
Racing Club Beirut players
Sagesse SC footballers
Lebanese Premier League players
Lebanese Second Division players
Lebanon international footballers